Jalhay is a municipality of Wallonia located in the province of Liège, Belgium. 

On 1 January 2006 Jalhay had a total population of 7,953. The total area is 107.75 km² which gives a population density of 74 inhabitants per km².

The municipality consists of the following districts: Jalhay and Sart.

See also
 List of protected heritage sites in Jalhay

References

External links
 

 
Municipalities of Liège Province